A mathematical model may mean a description of a physical system using mathematical concepts and language. "Mathematical model" may also refer to:
Model theory, a branch of mathematical logic, in which a model is a structure that satisfies a set of logical sentences
Physical models of mathematical objects, created for instructional or artistic purposes, including:
Polyhedron model, a physical model of a polyhedron
Mathematical Models (Cundy and Rollett), a book about constructing models of mathematical objects for secondary-school education
Mathematical Models (Fischer), a book of photographs and commentary on university collections of physical models of mathematical objects

See also
Model (disambiguation)